Eduard Serhiyovych Kozik (born 19 April 2003) is a Ukrainian professional footballer who plays as a centre-back for Shakhtar Donetsk.

Career
Born in Hrudky, Volyn Oblast, Kozik began his career in the neighbouring VIK-Volyn Volodymyr-Volynskyi academy school system, before transferring to the Shakhtar Donetsk academy in 2019.

He played in the Ukrainian Premier League Reserves for several seasons and made his debut for the senior Shakhtar Donetsk squad in the Ukrainian Premier League as a second-half substitute in a home victory over Inhulets Petrove on 5 November 2022.

References

External links
 
 

2003 births
Living people
Sportspeople from Volyn Oblast
Ukrainian footballers
Ukraine youth international footballers
Association football defenders
FC Shakhtar Donetsk players
FC Mariupol players
Ukrainian Premier League players